Doyle Township is a township in Clarke County, Iowa, USA.  As of the 2000 census, its population was 200.

Geography
According to the USGS, it contains three cemeteries: Gregg, Hopeville and Sanders.

The streams of East Long Creek and West Long Creek run through this township.

References
 USGS Geographic Names Information System (GNIS)

External links
 US-Counties.com
 City-Data.com

Townships in Clarke County, Iowa
Townships in Iowa